Jinfeng is a town under the administration of Zhangjiagang, Jiangsu, China. , it has 11 residential communities and 24 villages under its administration.

References 

Township-level divisions of Jiangsu
Zhangjiagang